Greenslade is a surname. Notable people with the surname include:

Arthur Greenslade (1923–2003), British conductor and composer
Dave Greenslade (born 1943), English keyboardist
Ellison Greenslade (born 1961), Bahamian police officer
Francis Greenslade (born 1962), Australian actor
Henry Greenslade (1867–1945), New Zealand politician
John Greenslade (1880–1950), United States Navy admiral
Malcolm Greenslade (born 1948), Australian rules footballer
Roy Greenslade, English journalism academic
Sidney Greenslade (1867–1955), English architect
Tosh Greenslade, Australian actor (part of seven-member cast of Shaun Micallef's Mad as Hell along with Francis Greenslade, however the pair are unrelated)
Wallace Greenslade (1912–1961), British radio announcer and newsreader